Geoffrey Robinson (born 1947) is a British former sports shooter.

Sports shooting career
Robinson competed at the 1984 Summer Olympics.

Robinson represented England and won a silver medal in the 10 metres air pistol pair with Frank Wyatt, another silver medal in the 50 metres free pistol and a bronze medal in the 50 metres free pistol pair with George Darling, at the 1982 Commonwealth Games in Brisbane, Queensland, Australia.

In 1979, Robinson represented Great Britain and won the Gold Medal in the ISSF 10-meter Air Pistol World Championship held in Seoul.

References

External links

1947 births
Living people
British male sport shooters
Shooters at the 1982 Commonwealth Games
Commonwealth Games medallists in shooting
Commonwealth Games silver medallists for England
Commonwealth Games bronze medallists for England
Olympic shooters of Great Britain
Shooters at the 1984 Summer Olympics
Medallists at the 1982 Commonwealth Games